The Masonic Template is an historic building in Victoria, British Columbia, Canada.  It is located at the intersection of Fisgard and Douglas Sts.

See also
 List of historic places in Victoria, British Columbia

References

External links
 

Buildings and structures in Victoria, British Columbia